BC Polkowice is a Polish professional women's basketball club that was founded in 1983 in the city of Polkowice. CCC Polkowice plays in the Energa Basket Liga Kobiet, the highest competition in Poland.

Titles
 Polish Championship:
 1st place (2): 2013, 2018
 2nd place (3): 2011, 2012, 2014, 2021
 3rd place (3): 2005, 2007, 2017
 Polish Cup (3): 2004, 2013, 2019

Current roster

References

External links
 Official Website

Women's basketball teams in Poland
Basketball teams established in 1983